Vadim Cemîrtan (born 21 July 1987) is a Moldovan footballer who plays as a striker for Dinamo-Auto Tiraspol in the Moldovan National Division.

Career statistics

International

References

External links
 
 
 Profile at Divizia Nationala

1987 births
People from Bender, Moldova
Moldovan footballers
Moldovan expatriate footballers
Moldova international footballers
Living people
Association football forwards
FC Tighina players
FC Academia Chișinău players
FC Iskra-Stal players
FC Nistru Otaci players
FC Costuleni players
FC Dinamo-Auto Tiraspol players
FC Dacia Chișinău players
Than Quang Ninh FC players
PFK Nurafshon players
FC Bunyodkor players
FC AGMK players
FC Sfîntul Gheorghe players
FC Zimbru Chișinău players
Ma'an SC players
Uzbekistan Super League players
Moldovan Super Liga players
Jordanian Pro League players
Moldovan expatriate sportspeople in Vietnam
Moldovan expatriate sportspeople in Uzbekistan
Moldovan expatriate sportspeople in Jordan
Expatriate footballers in Vietnam
Expatriate footballers in Uzbekistan
Expatriate footballers in Jordan